Javed Iqbal is a 2022 Pakistani film, that is based on the life of the notorious Pakistani serial killer and sex offender, Javed Iqbal. The film is written and directed by Abu Aleeha and stars Yasir Hussain in the titular role.Ayesha Omar will be seen playing a police officer in this film. The film is produced by Javed Ahmed under K K films.

The trailer of the film was released on 8 December 2021 with the film earlier scheduled to be released on 24 December 2021. However it was postponed until January 2022. The film was scheduled to release in the theatres on 28 January 2022 after a premiere in Karachi. However was banned by the Punjab government and the Central Board of Film Censors before its release. The film was selected for Berlin Film Festival.

Cast

Ban
The film was pulled out of theatres a day before its release, owing to the ban by the Punjab government and the Central Board of Film Censors. Pakistani celebrities such as Iqra Aziz, Ali Rehman Khan and Osman Khalid Butt came out in the support of the makers and protested against the ban.

References

External links
 

2022 films
Pakistani action films
Pakistani action thriller films